Americans in Sweden consists of immigrants and expatriates from the United States as well as Swedish people of American ancestry.

In 2021, there were 24,173 US-born people living in Sweden. 

According to the organization Democrats Abroad Sweden in 2020, there were  American citizens in Sweden.

See also 
 Swedish Americans
 Sweden–United States relations
 Swedish emigration to the United States

References 

Sweden
 
Ethnic groups in Sweden
American emigration
Immigration to Sweden